The Japanese destroyer  was the lead ship of the s, built for the Imperial Japanese Navy (IJN) during the late 1910s. The ship served in the Second Sino-Japanese War during the 1930s and spent the Pacific War on escort duties in Japanese waters and the East China Sea. She was sunk by an American submarine in early 1944 near Formosa.

Design and description
The Minekaze class was designed with higher speed and better seakeeping than the preceding s. They were powered by two Parsons geared steam turbines, each driving one propeller shaft, using steam provided by four Kampon water-tube boilers. Their crew consisted of 148 officers and crewmen.

The main armament of the Minekaze-class ships consisted of four  Type 3 guns in single mounts; one gun forward of the superstructure, one between the two funnels, one aft of the rear funnel, and the last gun atop the aft superstructure. The guns were numbered '1' to '4' from front to rear. The ships carried three above-water twin sets of  torpedo tubes; one mount was in the well deck between the forward superstructure and the forward gun and the other two were between the aft funnel and aft superstructure. They could also carry 20 mines as well as minesweeping gear.

Early in the war, Nos. 2 and 3 guns and both sets of aft torpedo tubes were removed in exchange for four depth charge throwers, 36 depth charges, and 10 license-built  Type 96 light AA guns.

Construction and career
Minekaze, built at the Maizuru Naval Arsenal, was the lead ship of this class. The destroyer was laid down on 20 April 1918, launched on 8 February 1919 and completed on 29 May 1920.

From 1930 to 1932, Destroyer Division 2 was assigned to the 1st Air Fleet as part of the escort of the aircraft carrier , to assist in search and rescue operations for downed aircraft. At the time of the First Shanghai Incident of 1932, Minekaze was engaged in river patrol duties along the Yangzi River in China. In 1937–38, Minekaze was assigned to patrols of the northern and central China coastlines in support of Japanese efforts in the Second Sino-Japanese War.

Pacific War
At the time of the attack on Pearl Harbor on 7 December 1941, Minekaze was based at the Chinkai Guard District in Korea, and was assigned to patrols of the Tsushima Straits and Chishima Islands coastlines. From April 1942, Minekaze was reassigned to the Sasebo Naval District for patrol and convoy escort duties. On 9 May, she assisted in the rescue of passengers from the Taiyō Maru, which had been sunk by an American submarine en route to southeast Asia with many civilian engineers and technicians. At the end of September, the destroyer escorted convoys to Saipan, Truk and Rabaul, and from the end of November 1942 to February 1944, was assigned to patrol and escort duties in the East China Sea. On 1 February 1944, Minekaze was reassigned to the 1st Surface Escort Division of the General Escort Command. Four days later, the ship departed Moji escorting a convoy bound for Takao. On 31 March 1944, Minekaze was removed from the Navy List.

Notes

References

External links
Minekaze-class destroyers on Materials of the Imperial Japanese Navy

Minekaze-class destroyers
Ships built by Maizuru Naval Arsenal
1919 ships
Second Sino-Japanese War naval ships of Japan
World War II destroyers of Japan
Ships sunk by American submarines
World War II shipwrecks in the Pacific Ocean
Shipwrecks in the Philippine Sea
Maritime incidents in February 1944